Glossophobia or speech anxiety is the fear of public speaking. The word glossophobia derives from the Greek γλῶσσα glossa (tongue) and φόβος phobos (fear or dread.) The causes of glossophobia are uncertain but explanations include communibiology and the illusion of transparency. Further explanations range from nervousness produced by a lack of preparation to, one of the most common psychiatric disorders, Social anxiety disorder (SAD).

Its symptoms include one or more of physiological changes, mental disruptions, and detrimental speech performance. There are several ways to overcome glossophobia, which include preparation and rehearsing, deconstructing beliefs, engaging in positive self-talk, visualizing optimal performance, practicing mindfulness, breathing exercises, creating an anxiety hierarchy, using virtual reality, computerized coaches and medications such as beta-blockers.

Causes 

Considerable research has been conducted into the causes of glossophobia, with a number of potential causes being suggested. One proposed explanation is that these anxieties are a specific symptom of social anxiety produced by fearfulness related to the Fight-or-flight response, which is produced by a perceived threat; this triggers an elevated defense reaction in the Sympathetic nervous system to be alert, to run, hide or freeze. It is linked to the psychiatric condition known as Social anxiety disorder (SAD) which is a mental predisposition to believe that social interactions will result in harsh negative judgement from others and poor outcomes because of such judgement; thus, before the social interaction occurs such as a public speech, the individual creates negative thoughts of failure, dread and the idea of being incapable, producing negative feelings and physiological responses.

Individuals who suffer from SAD engage in negative visualization and self-talk which halt their attention and ability to stay focused and drain their cognitive power and physical energy. People suffering from SAD believe they are just not good at public speaking, setting a belief as a fact and falling victim to a popular psychological phenomenon known as Self-fulfilling prophecy. Moreover, individuals with SAD add more mental pressure due to the fact that they commonly expect others to like them or accept them, measure their self-worth by their social interaction performance, and believe that showing emotions is the same as showing weakness.

A study with 59 individuals diagnosed with SAD and 63 non-anxious individuals in which they were engaged in an unexpected public speech, received standardized positive or neutral feedback and were asked to recall their positive feedback five minutes later and one week after their unexpected performance. Individuals suffering from SAD recalled their feedback less positively than what it had been, whereas some non-anxious individuals even recalled their feedback more positively suggesting a self-protective drive to maintain their self-esteem.

In addition, other key causes of this anxiety have been identified as the novelty of the experience, the characteristics of the audience, the illusion of transparency and the degree to which the speaker identifies public speaking as a performance as opposed to an act of communication.

Symptoms 
The more specific symptoms of speech anxiety can be grouped into three categories: physical, verbal, and non-verbal. Physical symptoms include: shaking, sweating, butterflies in the stomach, dry mouth, and rapid heartbeats. As Garcia-Lopez (2013) has noted, symptoms can include acute hearing, increased heart rate and blood pressure, dilated pupils, increased perspiration and oxygen intake, stiffening of neck/upper back muscles, and dry mouth. Uncontrollable shaking is also common and often occurs prior to the phobia-eliciting stimulus. Verbal symptoms include (but are not limited to) a tense or quivering voice, and vocalized pauses known as vocal fillers or Speech disfluency.  Nonverbal symptoms could include going blank during the speech, and remaining dependent on note cards.

Help and relief 

Training courses in public speaking and/or organizations such as Australian Rostrum, Toastmasters International, POWERtalk International, and Association of Speakers Clubs or cultural activities at school level can help people to reduce their fear of public speaking to manageable levels. To temporarily treat their phobia, some affected people have turned to certain types of medications, typically beta blockers.

In some cases, anxiety can be mitigated by a speaker not attempting to resist their anxiety, thus fortifying the anxiety/fight-or-flight loop. Other strategies involve using one's nervousness to enliven an otherwise fearful speech presentation.

Traditional advice has been to urge fearful speakers not to take themselves too seriously, and to be reminded that mistakes are often unnoticed by audiences. Gaining experience in public speaking often results in it becoming less anxiety-provoking over time. Recent studies suggest that there is a close link between fear of public speaking and self-efficacy and that attempts to help presenters improve their self-efficacy will also reduce this fear.

Loosening up a "tough crowd" by asking questions promotes audience participation. A speaker may also find this exercise to be helpful when their mind "goes blank", as it gives them time to regain their train of thought.

New treatments for glossophobia are starting to emerge through the medium of Virtual reality where environments with sufficient realism can evoke a response in the user allowing for a virtual form of exposure therapy known as VRET these self-administered treatments have been shown to be effective, but it is a relatively new field and more research is needed.

References by Harvard style

Bibliography
 Rothwell, J. Dan. In The Company of Others: An Introduction to Communication. New York: McGraw Hill, 2004.

Phobias
Public speaking